John the Deacon (Johannes Diaconus or Giovanni Diacono) may refer to:

John the Deacon (6th century), letter writer from Rome
John the Deacon (Egyptian chronicler), ca. 768, monk
Johannes Hymonides, d. before 882, known as John the Deacon of Rome
John the Deacon (Neapolitan historian), d. after 910
John the Deacon (Venetian chronicler), d. after 1008
John the Deacon (Byzantine writer), fl. 11th century; On the veneration of saints. 
John the Deacon of the Lateran, fl. 12th century

See also
John Deacon (disambiguation)